Hayots Dzor (literally "the valley of the Armenians") or Eruandunik/Yervandunik (from the name of the Orontid dynasty) was a canton (gavar) of the province of Vaspurakan of historical Armenia encompassing the area to the southeast of Lake Van, namely the valley of the Khoshab (Hoşap) River. It was bordered by the cantons of Rshtunik to the southwest, Tosp to the north, and Kughanovit to the east. Armenian folk tradition holds the region to be the site of the legendary battle between the Armenian patriarch Hayk and the Babylonian ruler Bel. Hayk is said to have founded the fortress of Haykʻ or Haykaberd (traditionally identified with the ruins of the Urartian fortress of Sardurihinili) at the site of the battle, in honor of which Hayots Dzor was named. 

The inhabitants of region irrigated their fields using the Khoshab River and the Shamiram Canal, which was built during the time of the Kingdom of Urartu. Hayots Dzor was populated almost entirely by Armenians until the 1890s, when Kurdish tribes began to settle in the area following the Hamidian massacres. As of 1911, there were 12 monasteries monasteries in the region of Hayots Dzor, five of which were standing and seven of which were in ruins. Around 10,000 Armenians lived in Hayots Dzor before the Armenian genocide, when the Armenian villages were destroyed and their inhabitants massacred or deported. 

According to Manvel Mirakhoryan, who traveled to the region in the late nineteenth century, the Armenian-populated villages of Hayots Dzor were as follows (modern-day Turkish names and district in parentheses): 

 Agrak
 Atʻanantsʻ (Atalan, Gevaş)
 Anggh (Dönemeç, Edremit)
 Ankshtantsʻ (Parmakkapi, Gürpınar)
 Aṛegh (Bozyiğit, Gürpınar)
 Astvatsashen (Çavuştepe, Gürpınar)
 Aradentsʻ (Çakinli, Gürpınar)
 Berdak (Doğanlar, Edremit)
 Zernak
 Trkʻashen (Uğurveren, Gevaş)
 Ishkhani Gom (Bakimli, Edremit)
 Kaṛnurd (Değirmendüzü, Gürpınar)
 Khachʻ
 Kharakantsʻ (Engisu, Edremit)
 Khekʻ (Yatağan, Gürpınar)
 Khndrakatar
 Khosp (Sakalar, Gürpınar)
 Khorgom (Dilkaya, Edremit)
 Kalbalasan (Arkboyu, Gürpınar)
 Karmrakʻar
 Kem (Köprüler, Edremit)
 Kendanantsʻ
 Kězěldash (Kiziltaş, Gevaş)
 Kghzi (Gürpınar)
 Hermeru
 Hilunkʻ
 Hirch (Gündoğan, Gevaş)
 Hndstan (Erkaldi, Gürpınar)
 Mashkatak (Gölbaşı, Edremit)
 Margs (Andaç, Edremit)
 Mulkʻ (Mülk, Edremit)
 Nanik
 Norgyugh (Yolaşan, Gürpınar)
 Vochkharantsʻ Verin, Vochkhrantsʻ Nerkʻin (Koyunyataği, Gürpınar)
 Pahantsʻ
 Pzhnkert Verin, Pzhnkert Nerkʻin
 Pltentsʻ (Aladüz, Gevaş)
 Spitak Vankʻ
 Surb Vardan (Kiyicak, Edremit)
 Vahrantsʻ, Toni (Gölardı, Gürpınar)
 Urtʻuk
 Pʻakakatuk (Bölmeçalı, Gürpınar)
 Kʻaravantsʻ (Çayırbaşı, Edremit)
 Kʻerts (Abali, Gevaş)
 Kʻeoshk (Köşk, Edremit and Ongün, Gürpınar)

References

See also 
List of regions of ancient Armenia
Armenians of Van
Gürpınar, Van

Early medieval Armenian regions